Camilla Ah Kin is an Australian actress known for her work on Holding the Man, Ali & the Ball and Going Home, and most recently Channel 9 Comedy series Here Come the Habibs.

Biography

Ah Kin is a graduate of the Western Australian Academy of Performing Arts. Her work includes theatre, film and TV as a performer. In 1992 she received a cultural scholarship from the government of France to study at L’ecole Internationale du Theatre Jacques Lecoq in Paris. She has also completed Master of Arts (Research) with the Department of Performance Studies at the University of Sydney.

Ah Kin has appeared in productions for companies including Bell Shakespeare, Belvoir, Sydney Theatre Company, Melbourne Theatre Company, WA Theatre Company (Black Swan), Ensemble Theatre and Griffin. She also has worked as a director, dramaturge and teacher.

In 2015 she was featured on the Australian romantic drama film Holding the Man. In 2016, Ah Kin was chosen to portray Mariam Habib in a leading role on Here Come the Habibs.

Credits
  Halifax f.p. (TV Series) (1996)
  Blue Heelers (TV Series) (1997)
  Murder Call (TV Series)  (1999)
  Going Home (TV Series)   (2000)
  All Saints (TV Series)   (2002-2007)
  Stories from the Golf (TV Series) (2004)
  Stupid Stupid Man (TV Series) (2006-2008)
  Ali & the Ball (Short)  (2008)
  Tough Nuts: Australia's Hardest Criminals (TV Series) (2011)
  Rake (TV Series) (2012)
  Holding the Man  (2015)
  Here Come the Habibs! (TV Series) (2016-2017)

References



Living people
Australian television actresses
Year of birth missing (living people)
Australian film actresses
21st-century Australian actresses